Haymarket is a town in Prince William County, Virginia, United States. The population was 1,552 as of the 2020 census.

History

Haymarket is built on land that used to be hunting grounds of the western Iroquois nations, who came from the New York and Pennsylvania area around the Great Lakes. They used hunting paths through the land until 1722, when they made a treaty with the colonies of Virginia and New York to move into the Blue Ridge Mountain region.

Due to the hunting paths, this location, and later the town, were given the nickname The Crossroads. The town of Haymarket began to be developed and built after the American Revolutionary War, formally founded in 1799 on the land of William Skinker. The Virginia General Assembly gave Skinker the rights to lay out the town, which he drew to consist of 13 streets and 140 lots. Shortly after, a clerk's office and jail were constructed in 1801, as the town had been selected as the site of what is now a district court. The town owed its early development to business and trade associated with the regular court sessions.

In 1807, the Virginia General Assembly abolished the district court in favor of the circuit court system, which established a court at each county seat. Until 1830 the court house remained the focal point of the town, while serving multiple purposes. In 1830, the court house was converted into and deeded as an Episcopal church; in 1833 it was consecrated as St Paul's.

During the Civil War, on November 4, 1862, Union troops invaded Haymarket and set the entire town on fire. Only four buildings survived: three small houses and St. Paul's Church. For the remainder of the war, Haymarket remained mostly uninhabited. A skirmish took place on October 19, 1863, involving the Second Brigade, Second Division, and Fifth Army Corps. Another skirmish took place on June 1863. They both involved Union encounters with the Confederate cavalry. Following General Robert E. Lee's surrender, Haymarket began to recover. Slowly it regained its former prosperity and size.

Post-Reconstruction Era to Present
Haymarket was incorporated in 1882, the second town in Prince William County to do so. The first mayor elected was Garrett Hulfish and the first councilmen elected were T.A. Smith, Charles Jordan, and William W. Meade. In May 1882 during the council's second meeting, the rudimentary ordinances were drafted and adopted.

On March 19, 1892, Lee Heflin and Joseph Dye were lynched in Haymarket. They had been convicted of the murder of a girl and sentenced to death, but the mob thought the legal system moved too slowly. The men were hanged from trees at the edge of woods; then the mob shot into their bodies. The Washington Post said, "mob law...is a dangerous thing to encourage. There is too much of it already throughout the country, and it spreads like a contagion so long as public sentiment tacitly approves it." It was unusual that white men were lynched; in Virginia and the rest of the South, usually black men were victims of lynching.

From 1882 to the present day, most of the buildings in central Haymarket have remained unchanged. The town borders U.S Route 15. Growth has occurred outside the town. While no schools are located within the town, the larger area has five schools – all part of the Prince William County School System. In the 1970s during the construction of the Interstate System, Haymarket was served by Exit 40 of Interstate 66. Being connected to the interstate, during a period of growth in the Northern Virginia region, has produced a population boom in the area of suburban development.

In 1994 The Walt Disney Company bought extensive amounts of land in Haymarket for a proposed Disney's America theme park.  Local resistance to the resort, because of perceived adverse effects on the Manassas Battlefield, resulted in the defeat of the park.

William B. Snyder, a local businessman, convinced Disney to sell the property to him. Snyder, in turn, sold off most of the land to developers, except for the  donated to the National Capital Area Council of the Boy Scouts of America. It used this land to develop Camp Snyder.

In addition to St. Paul's Church, Evergreen, Locust Bottom, Mt. Atlas, and Old Town Hall and School are listed on the National Register of Historic Places.

Geography

Haymarket is located at  (38.812670, −77.635084). Haymarket is located in the Piedmont region of Virginia, sitting at the base of Bull Run Mountains.

According to the United States Census Bureau, the town has a total area of 0.5 square miles (1.3 km2), all of it land.

The greater town of Haymarket (ZIP code 20169) has a total area of 32.2 square miles (83.4 km2), with 0.2 square miles (0.5 km2) of water.

Demographics

As of the 2020 census, there were 1,552 people living in the town. The 2019 census reported 464 households, and 377 families residing in the town. The population density was 1,725.2 people per square mile (665.5/km2). There were 337 housing units at an average density of 661.4 per square mile (255.1/km2). The racial makeup of the town was 92.04% White, 5.35% African American, 0.80% Asian, 0.68% from other races, and 1.14% from two or more races. Hispanic or Latino of any race were 2.73% of the population.

There were 464 households, out of which 52.2% had children under the age of 18 living with them, an estimated 60.8% were married couples living together, 8.41% had a female householder with no husband present, and 18.75% were non-families. 19.9% of all households were made up of individuals, and 3.9% had someone living alone who was 65 years of age or older. The average household size was 3.34 and the average family size was 3.67. In the town, the population was spread out, with 32.4% under the age of 18, 5.7% from 20 to 24, 12.2% from 25 to 34, 40.3% from 35 to 64, and 6.3% who were 65 years of age or older. The median age was 33.7 years. For every 100 females, there were 109.2 males. For every 100 females age 18 and over, there were 114.1 males.

The median income for a household in the town was $128,125; the per capita income was $46,943. Haymarket's zip code 20169 is the wealthiest in Prince William County. About 3.7% of the population was below the poverty line.

Points of Interest

Haymarket has over 38 courses within 20 miles of the town. Located just outside of Haymarket are the Bull Run Golf Club and Raspberry Golf Academy in the Bull Run Mountain Estates.

Silver Lake Regional Park is located outside of Haymarket. The park has over 230 acres as well as a 23-acre lake for fishing and non-motorized boats that is fed by the Little Bull Run. The 23-acre lake is stocked with species such as trout, bass, and catfish. The nearby James S. Long Regional Park has 4.6 miles of equestrian trails that connect to Silver Lake Regional Park via a bridge.

The piedmont region of Virginia, where Haymarket is located, produces many wineries such as La Grange. Prince William County has a history of winemaking that owes to the many wineries that were in operation during the 1800s and early 1900s.

Education
 Battlefield High School has been ranked by US News as the Number 1 high school in the Prince William County Public School System for several years. Additionally, the school has been ranked as Number 18 in the state as well as Number 833 nationally in 2021 out of 17,857 high schools nationwide.
 Haymarket Elementary School opened on September 2, 2014, after an August 19, 2014 ribbon-cutting ceremony.
 Mountain View Elementary opened in September 1995.
 Ronald Reagan Middle School opened in 2012.
 Samuel L. Gravely, Jr. Elementary School opened in 2008.
 Alvey Elementary School opened in 2003 and enrolled 458 students as of September 2020.

Public Safety
Haymarket, Virginia is considered one of the safest places in America, reporting a crime rate lower than 85% of all towns in America with a population of 1,000 or more residents. The crime rate in Haymarket is 14.7 times lower than the US average. In 2016, only 16 total offences were known to exist to law enforcement.

Transportation
Interstate 66 is the primary highway serving Haymarket. It extends westward to Interstate 81 near Front Royal, and eastward to Washington, D.C., with connections to Interstate 95 via Interstate 495. North-south travel is provided via U.S. Route 15, which skims the northwest side of town. US 15 connects north to Leesburg and south to Warrenton. Virginia State Route 55 also passes through Haymarket, serving as a local service road for I-66 and acting as Main Street within Haymarket.

See also
Boy Scouts of America's Camp Snyder

References

External links

 
 Prince William County Government
 St. Paul's School
 Haymarket Elementary School

Towns in Prince William County, Virginia
Populated places established in 1799
1799 establishments in Virginia
Towns in Virginia